Purbeck Miniature Railway is a  gauge miniature railway, located at The Purbeck School near Wareham, Dorset, England. Construction started in the late 1980s in co-operation with the Weymouth & District Society of Model Engineers and has closed due to building works on The Purbeck School.

The line runs from a passenger station at Monument, around the main playground, before crossing a bridge and passing through a tunnel to reach the second station where the main sheds are located.

Rolling stock
The line built its own rolling stock over the years, inspired by Heywood designs. There was a range of wagons for maintenance purposes including a ballast hopper, weedkiller tank, guards vans and open wagons. The passenger stock also varied from enclosed 4 wheel coaches to open sit astride trolleys.

Petrol and electric locomotives

Steam locomotives

Signalling
There was a signal box at Purbeck South which controlled the points and semaphore signals, allowing more than one train to operate at once. At Monument there was a simple arrangement of two platforms and a turntable, which was operated by the guard, shunter or driver.

Public operating
The line used to give rides to the public at car boot events, which were normally held on the first Sunday of each month. The railway has now been dismantled and is no longer in operation.

Junior Members Club
The line runs its own club for young people run by Noel Donnely, a former Purbeck school teacher. Public are welcome to come along and look and ride on the railway at the meetings or on special occasions and open days.

References

7¼ in gauge railways in England
Miniature railways in the United Kingdom
Rail transport in Dorset
Railway lines closed in 2013
Wareham, Dorset